Portenschlagiella is a monotypic genus of flowering plants belonging to the family Apiaceae. It has one known synonym of Portenschlagia . It only contains one known species, Portenschlagiella ramosissima (Port.) Tutin

Its native range is southern Italy and the western Balkan Peninsula, and it is found in Albania, Italy and Yugoslavia.

The genus name of Portenschlagiella is in honour of Franz Edler von Portenschlag-Ledermayr (1772–1822), an Austrian lawyer and botanist. Who collected in the Alps and the Dalmatian islands. The Latin specific epithet of ramosissima is derived from ramosissimus meaning 'with many branches'. Both the genus and the species were first described and published in Feddes Repert. Vol.74 on page 32 in 1967.

References

Apiaceae
Apiaceae genera
Plants described in 1967
Flora of Albania
Flora of Italy
Flora of Yugoslavia